is a Japanese manga series written and illustrated by Maki Enjōji. It was serialized in Shogakukan's Petit Comic magazine from June 2016 to January 2019 and published in seven volumes. A live-action television drama adaptation aired from January to March 2020.

Media

Manga
Written and illustrated by Maki Enjōji, the series began serialization in Shueisha's Petit Comic magazine on June 8, 2019. The series completed its serialization on January 8, 2021. Its individual chapters were collected into seven tankōbon volumes.

In March 2019, Viz Media announced that they licensed the series for English publication. The series is also licensed in Indonesia by Elex Media Komputindo under the title Everlasting Love.

Volume list

Live-action
A live-action television drama adaptation was announced in July 2019. The drama was directed by Kenta Tanaka among others, with Arisa Kaneko writing the scripts and Masako Miyazaki and Akiko Matsumoto producing. Mone Kamishiraishi and Takeru Satoh performed the lead roles. Official Hige Dandism performed the series' theme song, "I Love..." It was aired on TBS TV from January 14 to March 17, 2020, for a total of ten episodes.

References

External links
  
 

Drama anime and manga
Japanese romance television series
Japanese television dramas based on manga
Josei manga
Manga adapted into television series
Romance anime and manga
Shogakukan manga
Viz Media manga